Hot Summer in the City is a 1976 American adult film about a white virgin who is abducted by a group of black militants. The film's director is credited as "The Hare" on screen; for years, Gail Palmer publicly claimed to be the pseudonymous director, but in an unrelated trial against her former producing partner and companion Harry Mohney, she declared under oath she had not directed any films produced by Mohney which she received director credit for. "The Hare" is thus believed to be Harry Mohney himself, based on the similarities to his name. It is a co-production of Imperial Films with Mohney's Hare Films.

The film is classified as a classical roughie with its depiction of sexual violence on females. It also employs many of the popular blaxploitation themes of the period. Throughout the film the radio plays songs by Robert Knight, The Beach Boys, The Supremes, The Four Tops, The Doors, and The Shangri-Las, while "Summer in the City" by The Lovin' Spoonful is used as the theme song.

References

External links

1970s pornographic films
1976 films
Blaxploitation films
1970s exploitation films
1970s English-language films
Films about race and ethnicity
Interracial pornographic films
American exploitation films
American pornographic films
1970s American films